is a Japanese manga artist.

Career 
She was born in Yamanashi Prefecture. The first manga she read was 8 Man by Jiro Kuwata. In middle school, she started drawing manga herself.

Uchida started her professional career in 1974, when she won a newcomers award of the manga magazine Ribon and published her first short story Nami no Shougaibutsu Lace (なみの障害物レース). Until graduating university, Uchida worked as an assistant for Yukari Ichijo. Until 1977, she published exclusively in Ribon magazine and its sister magazines.

In 1977, she quit her contract with Ribon and became a freelancer. She published illustrations in magazines such as Lyrica and worked also as a book designer for a publisher.

When in 1978, Shueisha founded the new shōjo magazine Bouquet, she published her work in it from the first issue until around 1983. She was one of the main contributors of the magazine, besides Sakumi Yoshino, Akemi Matsunae and Wakako MIzuki. In this magazine she published her only longer series and her most successful work, Star Clock Liddell. The series was published from 1982 until 1983 first in chapters in the magazine, then in three volumes. The series was also translated into French and is set to be published in English by Glacier Bay Books.

In 1984, Uchida published her last short story. She published a few more illustrations in the late 1980s, but then ended her career and has lived withdrawn from the public. Her books are difficult to get ahold of in Japanese, as Uchida has not wanted that her books get republished.

Style 
Uchida is influenced by other shōjo manga artists as well as by European paintings, in particular the Pre-Raphaelite Brotherhood and Edward Burne-Jones.

Works 
 Hoshikuzuiro no Fune (星くず色の船), 1977
 Aki no Owari no Pianissimo (秋のおわりのピアニシモ), 1980
 Sora no Iro ni Niteiru (空の色ににている), 1980
 Kazumisô ni Yureru Kisha (かすみ草にゆれる汽車), 1981
 Star Clock Liddell (星の時計のLiddell Hoshi no Tokei no Liddell), 1982-1983
 Soumeikyuu - Soukuukan (草迷宮・草空間), 1985

References 

Women manga artists
1953 births
Living people